This article is about the demographics of American Samoa, including population density, ethnicity, education level, health of the populace, economic status, religious affiliations and other aspects of the population. American Samoa is an unincorporated territory of the United States located in the South Pacific Ocean.

Vital statistics
Births and deaths

Population statistics 

The statistics from 1900 to 1950 and every decennial census are from the U.S. Census Bureau. There was no census taken in 1910, but a special census taken in 1912. Beginning with the 1930 Census, Swain Island is included in the population count for American Samoa. The remaining statistics are from the World Factbook, unless otherwise indicated.

Population
Approximately 55,212, but the Factbook states 49,437 (2020 estimate). About 65% of the population are U.S. nationals, of whom at least 10% are U.S. citizens. Of the foreign-born population, 81% are from Samoa, 9% are from other parts of Oceania, and 9% are from Asia.

Age structure
0–14 years: 27.76% (male 7,063/female 6,662)
15–24 years: 18.16% (male 4,521/female 4,458)
25–54 years: 37.49% (male 9,164/female 9,370)
55–64 years: 9.69% (male 2,341/female 2,447)
65 years and over: 6.9% (male 1,580/female 1,831) (2020 est.)

Median age
total: 27.2 years
male: 26.7 years
female: 27.7 years (2020 est.)

Population growth rate
−2.1% (2021 est.)

Birth rate
17.19 births/1,000 population (2021 est.)

Death rate
6 deaths/1,000 population (2021 est.)

Net migration rate
−32.18 migrant(s)/1,000 population (2021 est.)

Urbanization
Urban population: 87.2% of total population (2020)
Rate of urbanization: 0.07% annual rate of change (2015-20 est.)

Sex ratio
At birth: 1.06 male(s)/female
0–14 years: 1.06 male(s)/female
15–24 years: 1.01 male(s)/female
25–54 years: 0.98 male(s)/female
55–64 years: 0.96 male(s)/female
65 years and over: 0.86 male(s)/female
Total population: 1 male(s)/female (2020 est.)

Infant mortality rate
Total: 10.25 deaths/1,000 live births
Male: 12.39 deaths/1,000 live births
Female: 8 deaths/1,000 live births (2021 est.)

Life expectancy at birth
Total population: 75.06 years
Male: 72.55 years
Female: 77.72 years (2021 est.)

Total fertility rate
2.28 children born/woman (2021 est.)

Nationality
Noun: American Samoan(s) (US Nationals)
Adjective: American Samoan

Ethnic groups
Pacific Islander 92.6% (includes Samoan 88.9%, Tongan 2.9%, other 0.8%)
Asian 3.6% (includes Filipino 2.2%, other 1.4%)
Mixed 2.7%
Other 1.2% (2010 est.)

Religions
Christian 98.3%
Other 1%
Unaffiliated 0.7% (2010 est.)
Major Christian denominations on the island include the Congregational Christian Church in American Samoa, the Catholic Church, the Church of Jesus Christ of Latter-day Saints and the Methodist Church of Samoa. Collectively, these churches account for the vast majority of the population. 

J. Gordon Melton in his book claims that the Methodists, Congregationalists with the London Missionary Society, and Catholics led the first Christian missions to the islands. Other denominations arrived later, beginning in 1895 with the Seventh-day Adventists, various Pentecostals (including the Assemblies of God), Church of the Nazarene, Jehovah's Witnesses, and the Church of Jesus Christ of Latter-day Saints.

The World Factbook 2010 estimate shows the religious affiliations of American Samoa as 98.3% Christian, other 1%, unaffiliated 0.7%. World Christian Database 2010 estimate shows the religious affiliations of American Samoa as 98.3% Christian, 0.7% agnostic, 0.4% Chinese Universalist, 0.3% Buddhist, and 0.3% Baháʼí.

According to Pew Research Center, 98.3% of the total population is Christian. Among Christians, 59.5% are Protestant, 19.7% are Catholic and 19.2% are other Christians. A major Protestant church on the island, gathering a substantial part of the local Protestant population, is the Congregational Christian Church in American Samoa, a Reformed denomination in the Congregationalist tradition. , The Church of Jesus Christ of Latter-day Saints website claims membership of 16,180 or one-quarter of the whole population, with 41 congregations, and 4 family history centers in American Samoa. The Jehovah's Witnesses claim 210 "ministers of the word" and  3 congregations.

Languages
Native languages include:
Samoan 88.6% 
English 3.9%
Tongan 2.7%
Other Pacific islander 3%
Other 1.8% (2010 est.)

English proficiency is very high.

References

 
Economy of American Samoa
Geography of American Samoa
Society of American Samoa
American Samoa